Padamudra is a 1988 Indian Malayalam-language drama film written and directed by R. Sukumaran. Starring Mohanlal in the dual roles of Soap Kuttappan and Maathu Pandaaram, and also stars Seema and Nedumudi Venu. The film features original songs composed by Vidyadharan and background score by Johnson. The film won Mohanlal the Filmfare Award for Best Malayalam Actor and Kerala State Film Award – Special Jury Award.

Plot

The film takes place where an emotional battle happens to a son due to his father. Mohan Lal plays dual roles, one is a worker in the quarry, while the other is a home business owner.

Pandaram, a traveling vendor, has an illicit relationship with Gojamma, a simple village woman. Their son, Kuttappan, is haunted by childhood memories of his father and tries to find out the truth.

Cast

Mohanlal as Soap Kuttappan and Maathu Pandaaram (Dual roles)
Seema
Nedumudi Venu
Sithara
Urvashi
Rohini as Aswothi
Shyama
Mala Aravindan
Jagadish
Adoor Bhavani 
Kalasala Babu
Thikkurissy Sukumaran Nair

Soundtrack

Reception 
Neelima Menon of The News Minute wrote, "The film oscillates between the past and the present, with Mohanlal catching the variations of the dual character with impeccable nuance, be it the anger, self-loathing and vulnerability simmering in the son or the lasciviousness and cockiness of the father."

Trivia

 Noted singer Vidhu Prathap made his singing debut in this film. He sang the song Ambalamillathe Aaltharyail along with a choir when he was 9 years old.

References

External links
 

1988 films
1980s Malayalam-language films
Indian drama films
Films shot in Kollam